Naria is a genus of sea snails, cowries, marine gastropod mollusks in the subfamily Erosariinae of the family Cypraeidae, the cowries.

Species
Species within the genus Naria include:

Naria acicularis (Gmelin, 1791)
 † Naria agassizi (Ladd, 1934) 
Naria albuginosa (Gray, 1825)
Naria beckii (Gaskoin, 1836)
Naria bernardi (Richard, 1974)
 † Naria bezoyensis (Dolin & Lozouet, 2004) 
Naria boivinii (Kiener, 1843)
Naria cernica (G.B. Sowerby II, 1870)
Naria citrina (Gray, 1825)
Naria eburnea Barnes, 1924
Naria englerti (Summers & Burgess, 1965)
Naria erosa (Linnaeus, 1758)
 † Naria everwijni (K. Martin, 1884) 
 Naria franzhuberi Thach, 2020
Naria gangranosa (Dillwyn, 1817)
Naria helvola (Linnaeus, 1758)
Naria irrorata (Gray, 1828), the type species
Naria labrolineata (Gaskoin, 1849)
Naria lamarckii (Gray, 1825)
Naria macandrewi (G.B. Sowerby II, 1870)
Naria marginalis (Dillwyn, 1817)
Naria miliaris (Gmelin, 1791)
Naria nebrites (Melvill, 1888)
Naria ocellata (Linnaeus, 1758)
Naria ostergaardi (Dall, 1921)
Naria poraria (Linnaeus, 1758)
 † Naria praehelvola Fehse & Vicián, 2021 
Naria spurca (Linnaeus, 1758)
Naria thomasi (Crosse, 1865)
Naria turdus (Lamarck, 1810)

References

 Broderip W.J. (1837). Cypraeidae, pp. 254–259, In: C. Knight (ed.), The Penny Cyclopaedia of the Society for the diffusion of useful knowledge. C. Knight, London. Vol. 8, 510 pp.
 Lorenz, F. (2017). Cowries. A guide to the gastropod family Cypraeidae. Volume 1, Biology and systematics. Harxheim: ConchBooks. 644 pp.

External links
 Iredale, T. (1930). Queensland molluscan notes, No. 2. Memoirs of the Queensland Museum. 10(1): 73-88, pl. 9
 Iredale, T. (1939). Australian Cowries: Part II. Australian Zoologist. 9(3): 297-323, 3 pl.
 Weinkauff, H.C. (1881). Catalog der Gattung Cypraea Linné. Jahrbücher der Deutschen Malakozoologischen Gesellschaft. 8: 133-157
 Jeffreys, J. G. (1883). Mediterranean Mollusca N. 3 and other Invertebrata. Annals and Magazine of Natural History. (5)11: 393-401, pl. 16
 Steadman, W. R. & Cotton, B. C. (1946). A key to the classification of the cowries (Cypraeidae). Records of the South Australian Museum. 8: 503-530
 Troschel, F. H. (1856-1893). Das Gebiss der Schnecken zur Begründung einer natürlichen Classification. Nicolaische Verlagsbuchhandlung, Berlin.

Cypraeidae
Taxa named by John Edward Gray